Judith Miller (born 1948) is an American journalist.

Judith Miller may also refer to:

Judith Miller (philosopher) (1941–2017), French philosopher
Judith Miller (antiques expert) (born 1951), TV presenter and writer
Judith A. Miller, American lawyer and government official
Judith McCoy Miller (born 1944), author of Christian fiction
Judy Miller, a character on TV series Still Standing
Judy Hoback Miller (born 1937), American woman known for her involvement in the Watergate scandal